"Aren't You Glad" is a song written by Brian Wilson and Mike Love for American rock band the Beach Boys. The two also share lead vocal. It was released in 1967 as the second track on their studio album Wild Honey.

In its 1968 review of the LP, Rolling Stone called it a "Lovin' Spoonful type song with the Beach Boys touch". That same year, Rolling Stone editor Gene Sculatti said "['Aren't You Glad'] achieves a Miracles style smoothness via a Bobby Goldsboro-type song". In 1979, Byron Preiss wrote that the song "epitomized the simple energy of the album".

A live version was released on the album Live in London (1970).

Personnel

The Beach Boys
 Brian Wilson – vocals, piano
 Mike Love – vocals
 Carl Wilson – vocals, bass

Session musicians
Arnold Belnick - violin
Norman Botnick - viola
David Burk - viola
Bonnie Douglas - violin
Ollie Mitchell - trumpet
Alexander Neiman - viola
Wilbert Nuttycombe - violin
Jerome Reisler - violin
Paul Shure - violin
Anthony Terran - trumpet
Per Craig Slowinski; whoever played the track's drums, guitar, organ, and Chamberlin could not be determined.

Cover versions

1968 – Peggy March

References

Further reading
 

1967 songs
The Beach Boys songs
American power pop songs
Songs written by Brian Wilson
Songs written by Mike Love
Song recordings produced by the Beach Boys